Willson is an English language patronymic surname, literally "son of William" (William an old Old German name). There are other spellings, such as the more common Wilson variant.  Willson is less common as a given name.  Willson may refer to:

Surname
 Alan N. Willson, Jr. (born 1939), American electrical engineer
 Alice Willson (1889–1980), First Lady of North Carolina
 Augustus E. Willson (1846–1931), American politician
 Bob Willson (born 1928), Canadian broadcaster
 Brian Willson (born 1941), American Vietnam War veteran and activist
 Chloe Clark Willson (1818-1874), American teacher in the territory that became Oregon
 Crowell Willson (1815–1894), Canadian farmer and politician
 Crowell Willson (Upper Canada) (1762–1832), Canadian farmer and politician
 David Willson (1778–1866), religious leader and mystic
 David Harris Willson (1901–1973), American historian and professor
 Diddie Willson (1911–1961), American football player
 Forceythe Willson (1837–1867), American poet
 Fred F. Willson (1877-1956), American architect
 Henry Willson (1911–1978), American talent agent
 James C. Willson (1833-?), Canadian-born Michigan politician
 John Willson (1776–1860), Canadian judge and politician
 Laurel Rose Willson (1941–2002), American whose claims of Satanic ritual abuse were a hoax
 Lester S. Willson (1839-1919), Civil War (U.S.) officer and Bozeman, Montana merchant
 Luke Willson (born 1990), American Football player
 Maria Willson, British singer
 Marty Willson-Piper (born 1958), guitarist and member of Australian independent rock band The Church
 Meredith Willson (1902–1984), American composer, playwright
 Michael Willson (born 1963), British actor
 Paul Willson (born 1945), American actor
 Quentin Willson (born 1957), British TV presenter and motoring expert
 Robert Willson (disambiguation), one of several people
 Russell Willson (1883–1948), American vice admiral, inventor of the Naval Cipher Box
 Simon Willson, Hong Kong radio producer, DJ, actor
 Stephen Clarke-Willson, American video game and software expert
 Thomas Willson (1860–1915), Canadian inventor
 William H. Willson (1805–1856), American politician
 William Willson (businessman) (1927–2003), chairman of Aston Martin (1972–1975)

Given name or nickname
 Willson Contreras (born 1992), Venezuelan baseball player
 Willson Osborne (1906–1979), American composer
 Willson Woodside (1905-1991), Canadian journalist

See also
 Willson (disambiguation)
 Wilson (disambiguation)

Masculine given names
English-language surnames
Patronymic surnames
Surnames from given names